Stuart Trevor Youngman (born 15 October 1965) is an English former footballer who played as a midfielder in the Football League for Colchester United.

Career

Born in Beccles, Youngman was given youth-team trial games in 1983 by Colchester United manager Cyril Lea, and was subsequently awarded a professional contract in 1984. His one and only season with Colchester was blighted by injury, but he was still able to make a first team appearance on 23 April 1985 in a Fourth Division 1–0 defeat by Aldershot as a substitute for Dave Hubbick.

After his Colchester exit in the summer of 1985, Youngman went on to play for Wroxham, Lowestoft Town and was club captain at Gorleston. He also played for hometown club Beccles Town and later became assistant manager for the club before stepping down in January 2007 due to family commitments.

References

1965 births
Living people
People from Beccles
English footballers
Association football midfielders
Colchester United F.C. players
Wroxham F.C. players
Lowestoft Town F.C. players
Gorleston F.C. players
Beccles Town F.C. players
English Football League players